Antonio Baiamonti (19February 182213January 1891) was an Austrian and Dalmatian Italian politician and longtime mayor of Split. He is remembered as one of the most successful mayors of the city, occupying the post almost continuously for twenty years (1860–1880). He was the last Italian mayor of Split. He was a medical doctor by profession. Bajamonti's parents were Giuseppe Bajamonti (Pretorial Chancellor of Vis) and Elena Candido of Šibenik.

Mayor of Split

Bajamonti became Mayor of Split on 9January 1860 for the Autonomist Party (succeeding Šimun de Michieli-Vitturi) and stayed in office until 1864, when he was relieved because of his opposition to Austrian centralism. He was replaced by Frano Lanza, but in 1865 he united with the People's Party into the Liberal Union and won the elections again.

He would go on to hold the post for over two decades, until 1880, when he retired from office and was succeeded by Aleksandar Nallini, another Autonomist. After democratic reforms allowed for a greater part of the populace to vote, Bajamonti's Autonomist Party lost the 1882 elections. Croatian Dalmatians, who made up the majority of the population of Split, were able to influence the vote sufficiently and a People's Party mayor was elected, Dujam Rendić-Miočević, a prominent Split lawyer.

Diet of Dalmatia

Bajamonti was also a member of the Diet of Dalmatia (1861–91) and the Austrian Chamber of Deputies (1867–70 and 1873–79). He married Alojzija Kružević on 6October 1849.

For many years Bajamonti enjoyed the support of Croats and Italians and in this period of relative social peace was the propeller of important public works.

In 1859, before his election, he built a public theatre with his own money. During his administration, gas lighting was installed instead of oil, the Society for the construction and embellishment of Split was established, the west wing of the representative building on the Prokurative square was built and the old Diocletian's aqueduct waterworks were renovated.

For his initiative Split was also equipped with a square surrounded by galleries. His most famous work was the construction of a large fountain that was named later after him. Three months after the second opening the fountain Antonio Bajamonti died. The fountain was demolished in 1947 by city authorities as a symbol of fascism and Italian occupation.

Bajamonti instituted the policy Dalmatian Society (1886) and Società Accommodation Split (1888), until, severely indebted, died in his hometown on 13January 1891. When he died, the information about his death was displayed in almost all the press in Italy.

See also

 House of Bajamonti
 Dalmatia
 Dalmatianism

References

Further reading

Croatian
 Bajamonti Family-Prints in Library & Information Science (Ex libris Bajamonti u Sveučilišnoj knjižnici u Splitu)
 Matica.hr Short History of Split's Riva
 

Italian
 Bajamonti: "A noi Dalmati non resta che soffrire"
 Randi, Oscar. Antonio Bajamonti il «Mirabile» Podestà di Spalato, Società Dalmata di Storia Patria, Zara 1932
 Luciano Monzali, Italiani di Dalmazia. Dal Risorgimento alla Grande Guerra, Le Lettere, Firenze 2004
 Valentino Quintana, Vittorio Vetrano di San Mauro Il carattere Italiano della Venezia Giulia e della Dalmazia, Quattroventi, Urbino 2009

1822 births
1891 deaths
People from Split, Croatia
People from the Kingdom of Dalmatia
Dalmatian Italians
Autonomist Party politicians
Members of the Austrian House of Deputies (1867–1870)
Members of the Austrian House of Deputies (1873–1879)
Mayors of Split, Croatia